Hamisi Amani-Dove (born March 28, 1974) is a retired American soccer player.

Youth
A graduate of Rutgers University, sixth all-time scoring leader at the university with thirty-two goals in seventy-two games, he was drafted by the MetroStars of Major League Soccer after college. He turned down the offer, opting to sign with AZ in the Dutch Eerste Divisie. In 1996, he was also selected for the U.S. Olympic Team for the Atlanta Olympics. Amani-Dove scored the equalizer in the away match against ADO Den Haag in 1998, which secured promotion for the club.

Professional
After the Netherlands, Amani-Dove played with Bad Bleiberg and was a featured player scoring 32 goals in two seasons with the club. In 1999 the player made a move to Tzafririm Holon in the Israeli first division where Amani-Dove again showed his scoring touch with nineteen goals in his two seasons with the club. In 2001 the Dallas Burn of Major League Soccer acquired Amani-Dove. In 2002 looking to transition from professional soccer to the business world, Amani-Dove moved to the USL and played with the Rochester Rhinos in 2002 and the Virginia Beach Mariners from 2003 to 2005., which gave him more time to pursue off-of-the-field opportunities.

Post-soccer employment
Amani-Dove retired in 2005 and is now a businessman in the Washington, D.C. metro area. Amani-Dove has guest speaking engagements across the country focused on the importance of recreational programs and sports for youth. He also provides guest technical training for many youth clubs in Maryland and Virginia.

References

1974 births
Living people
American soccer players
American expatriate soccer players
American expatriate sportspeople in Austria
American expatriate sportspeople in the Netherlands
American expatriate sportspeople in Israel
Expatriate footballers in Austria
Expatriate footballers in the Netherlands
Expatriate footballers in Israel
Rutgers University alumni
Rutgers Scarlet Knights men's soccer players
AZ Alkmaar players
Hapoel Tzafririm Holon F.C. players
Israeli Premier League players
FC Dallas players
Major League Soccer players
USL First Division players
Rochester New York FC players
Virginia Beach Mariners players
Soccer players from New York City
A-League (1995–2004) players
New York Red Bulls draft picks
United States men's under-20 international soccer players
Association football forwards